The theory of positive disintegration (TPD) is an idea of personality development developed by Polish psychologist Kazimierz Dąbrowski. Unlike mainstream psychology, the idea views psychological tension and anxiety as necessary for personal growth. These "disintegrative" processes are "positive", whereas people who fail to go through positive disintegration may stop at "primary integration", possessing individuality but nevertheless lacking an autonomous personality and remaining impressionable. Entering into disintegration and subsequent higher processes of development continues through developmental potential, including over-excitability and hypersensitivity.

Unlike other theories of development such as Erikson's stages of psychosocial development, it is not assumed that even a majority of people progress through all levels. TPD is also not a theory of stages, and levels do not correlate with age; tension and anxiety do not correlate to maturity.

Dąbrowski's theory
The development of the theory of positive disintegration began in Dąbrowski's earliest Polish works, as reflected in his 1929 doctoral thesis. His first work in English (1937) also contained seeds of the theory. His next major English work was his 1964 book Positive Disintegration. He proposed that the key to mental growth was having strong "developmental potential" (DP): a constellation of psychological factors that are genetically inherited. Strong DP often leads to the disintegration of existing psychological structures. These disintegrations allow the individual to volitionally reorganize their priorities and values, leading to psychological growth.

Dąbrowski's theory of personality development emphasizes several major features, including:
 personality is not a given universal trait; it must be created—shaped— by the individual to reflect his or her own unique character (personality shaping).
 personality develops as a result of the action of developmental potential (DP) (including overexcitability and the autonomous (third) factor). Not everyone displays sufficient DP to move through the process of mental growth: positive disintegration.
 Dąbrowski used a multilevel approach to describe the continuum of developmental levels seen in the population.
 developmental potential creates crises characterized by strong anxieties and depressions—psychoneurosis— that precipitate disintegrations.
 for personality to develop, initial integrations based on instinct and socialization must disintegrate— a process Dąbrowski called positive disintegration.
 the development of a hierarchy of individual values—emotional reactions— is a critical component in developing one's personality and one's autonomy; thus, in contrast to most psychological theories, emotions play a major role in this approach.
 emotional reactions guide the individual in creating their individual personality ideal, an autonomous standard that acts as the goal of individual development.
 individuals must examine their essence and develop their own unique personality ideal. Subsequently they can make existential choices that emphasize those aspects of self that are higher and "more myself" and inhibit those aspects that are lower or "less myself" based upon their personality ideal, thus shaping their personality; this creates an authentic self based upon the fundamental essence of the individual.
 critical components of individual development include; self-education, subject-object, personality ideal, self-perfection, and autopsychotherapy.

Factors in personality development
Dąbrowski observed that most people live their lives in a state of "primary or primitive integration" largely guided by biological impulses ("first factor") and/or by uncritical endorsement and adherence to social conventions ("second factor"). He called this initial integration Level I. Dąbrowski observed that at this level, there is no true individual expression of the autonomous human self; hence, they have no autonomous personality, and rather, they exhibit Nietzsche's idea of the herd personality. Individual expression at Level I is influenced and constrained by the first two factors.

The first factor channels energy and talents toward accomplishing self-serving goals that reflect the "lower instincts" and biological ego, as its primary focus is on survival and self-advancement. The second factor, the social environment (milieu) and peer pressure, constrains individual expression and creativity by encouraging a group view of life and discouraging individual thought and expression. The second factor externalizes values and morals, thereby externalizing conscience. Social forces shape expectations. Behavior and one's talents and creativity are funneled into forms that follow and support the existing social milieu. Because conscience is derived from an external social context, so long as society holds ethical standards, people influenced by the second factor will behave ethically. However, if a society becomes corrupt, people strongly influenced by the second factor will not dissent. Socialization without individual examination leads to a rote and robotic existence (the "robopath" described by Ludwig von Bertalanffy). Individual reactions are not unique, they are based upon social contexts. According to Dąbrowski, people primarily motivated by the second factor represent a significant majority of the general population.

Dąbrowski felt that society was largely influenced by the two lower factors and could be characterized as operating at Level I. Its external value system absolves the individual of any individual responsibility. He also described groups of people who display a different developmental course: an individualized developmental pathway. Such people break away from an automatic, rote, socialized view of life (which Dąbrowski called negative adjustment) and are said to move into and through a series of personal disintegrations. Dąbrowski saw these disintegrations as a key element in the overall developmental process. Crises challenge the status quo and cause people to review the self, their ideas, values, thoughts, ideals, etc. 

If development continues, one goes on to develop an individualized, conscious and critically evaluated hierarchical value structure (called positive adjustment). This hierarchy of values acts as a benchmark by which all things are now seen, and the higher values in the individual's internal hierarchy come to direct behavior (no longer based on external social mores). These higher, individual values characterize an eventual second integration reflecting individual autonomy and for Dąbrowski, mark the arrival of true human personality. At this level, each person develops their own vision of how life ought to be and lives it. This higher level is associated with strong individual approaches to problem solving and creativity. One's talents and creativity are applied in the service of these higher individual values and visions of how life could be—how the world ought to be. The person expresses their "new" autonomous personality energetically through action, art, social change, and so on.

Development potential
Advanced development is often seen in people who exhibit strong developmental potential ("DP"). Developmental potential represents a constellation of genetic features. It may be positive or negative, it may be strong or weak. If it is strong, the input of the environment is minimal. If DP is weak, the environment will play a critical role. Many factors are incorporated in developmental potential but three major aspects are highlighted: overexcitability (OE), specific abilities and talents, and a strong drive toward autonomous growth, a feature Dąbrowski called the "third factor."

Overexcitability
The most evident aspect of developmental potential is overexcitability (OE), a heightened physiological experience of stimuli resulting from increased neuronal sensitivities. The greater the OE, the more intense are the day-to-day experiences of life. Dąbrowski outlined five forms of OE: psychomotor, sensual, imaginational, intellectual, and emotional. These overexcitabilities, especially the latter three, often cause a person to experience daily life more intensely and to feel the extremes of the joys and sorrows of life profoundly. Dąbrowski studied human exemplars and found that heightened overexcitability was a key part of their developmental and life experience. These people are steered and driven by their value "rudder," their experience of emotional OE. Combined with imaginational and intellectual OE, these people have a powerful and multilevel perception of the world.

Although based in the nervous system, overexcitabilities come to be expressed psychologically through the development of structures that reflect the emerging autonomous self. The most important of these conceptualizations are dynamisms: biological or mental forces that control behavior and its development. Instincts, drives, and intellectual processes combined with emotions are dynamisms. With advanced development, dynamisms increasingly reflect movement toward autonomy.

Abilities and talents
The second aspect of developmental potential, specific abilities, and talents tends to serve the person's developmental level. As outlined, people at lower levels use talents to support egocentric goals or to climb the social and corporate ladders. At higher levels, specific talents and abilities become an important force as they are channeled by the person's value hierarchy into expressing and achieving the person's vision of their ideal personality and their view of how the world ought to be.

The third factor
The third aspect of developmental potential (DP), which is simply referred to as 'the third factor,' is a drive toward individual growth and autonomy. The third factor is critical as it applies one's talents and creativity toward autonomous expression, and second, it provides motivation to strive for more and to try to imagine and achieve goals currently beyond one's grasp. Dąbrowski was clear to differentiate third factor from free will. He felt that free will did not go far enough in capturing the motivating aspects that he attributed to third factor.  For example, an individual can exercise free will and show little motivation to grow or change as an individual. Third factor specifically describes motivation—a motivation to become one's self. This motivation is often so strong that, in some situations, one can observe that one needs to develop oneself and that in so doing, it places one at great peril. This feeling of "I've gotta be me"  especially when it is "at any cost" and especially when it is expressed as a strong motivator for self-growth is beyond the usual conceptualization ascribed to free will. 

A person whose DP is high enough will generally undergo disintegration, despite any external social or family efforts to prevent it. A person whose DP is very low will generally not undergo disintegration (or positive personality growth) even in a conducive environment.

The notion of overexcitability that Dabrowski describes appears to have been independently developed by Elaine Aron (see Highly sensitive person) Note: the details of Aron's approach are substantially different from Dąbrowski's).

Developmental obstacles
Dąbrowski called OE "a tragic gift" to reflect that the road of the person with strong OE is not a smooth or easy one. Potentials to experience great highs are also potentials to experience great lows. Similarly, potentials to express great creativity hold the likelihood of experiencing a great deal of personal conflict and stress. This stress both drives development and is a result of developmental conflicts, both intrapsychic and social. Suicide is a significant risk in the acute phases of this stress. The isolation often experienced by these people may also heighten the risk of self-harm.

Dąbrowski advocated autopsychotherapy, educating the person about his theory and the disintegrative process to give them a context within which to understand intense feelings and needs. Dąbrowski suggested giving people support in their efforts to develop and find their own self-expression. Children and adults with high DP (and OE) have to find and walk their own path, often at the expense of fitting in with their social peers and even with their families.  At the core of autopsychotherapy is the awareness that no one can show anyone else the "right" path.  Everyone has to find their own path for themselves. Alluding to the knights on the Grail Quest, the Jungian analyst, Joseph Campbell allegedly said: "If a path exists in the forest, don't follow it, for though it took someone else to the Grail, it will not take you there, because it is not your path."

The levels
The first and fifth levels are characterized by psychological integration, harmony, and little inner conflict. There is little internal conflict at Level I because just about every behavior is justified—it is either good for the individual and is therefore "right," or the individual's society endorses it and it is therefore "right."  In either case, with a high level of confidence, the individual acts as they perceive anyone else would and does what everyone is "supposed to do." At Level V there is no internal conflict because what a person does is in harmony with their own internal sense of values. Of course, there is often external conflict at both Levels I and V.

Levels II, III, and IV describe various degrees and types of disintegration.

Dąbrowski was very clear that the levels he presents "represent a heuristic device." In the process of developing the structures of two or even three contiguous levels may exist side by side, although it must be understood that they exist in conflict. The conflict is resolved when one of the structures is eliminated, or at least comes under complete control of another structure.

Level I: Primary integration
As outlined above, the first level is called primitive or primary integration. People at this level are often influenced primarily by either prominent first factor (heredity/impulse) and/or second factor (social environment) forces.  The majority of people at Level I are integrated at the environmental or social level (Dąbrowski called them so-called average people); however, many also exhibit shades of both impulse and socialization. Dąbrowski distinguished the two subgroups of Level I by degree: "the state of primary integration is a state contrary to mental health. A fairly high degree of primary integration is present in the average person; a very high degree of primary integration is present in the psychopath". Marked by selfishness and egocentrism (both reticent and explicit), those at level one development generally seek self-fulfillment above all, justifying their pursuits through a sort of "it's all about me" thinking; or, more simply put, they adhere strongly to the phrase "the end justifies the means," sometimes disregarding the severity of the "means." Many people who are considered "leaders" often fall into this category.

A vast majority of people either do not break down their primitive integration at all or after a relatively short period of disintegration, usually experienced at the time of adolescence and early youth, end in a reintegration at the former level or in partial integration of some of the functions at slightly higher levels, without a transformation of the whole mental structure. Primary integration in the average person was proposed to be of a certain value due to its stability and predictability, and when accompanied by kindness and good-will, could represent persons who can provide support and stability to those experiencing disintegration.

Level II: Unilevel disintegration
The prominent feature of this level is an initial, brief, and often intense crisis or series of crises.  Crises are spontaneous and occur on only one level. These crises involve alternatives that may appear to be different but ultimately are on the same level.

Unilevel disintegration occurs during developmental crises such as puberty or menopause, in periods of difficulty in handling some stressful external event, or under psychological conditions such as nervousness and psychoneurosis.  Unilevel disintegration consists of processes on a single structural and emotional level; there is a prevalence of automatic dynamisms with only slight self-consciousness and self-control.

Conflicts on the same level (horizontal) produce ambitendencies and ambivalences: one is equally attracted by different but equivalent choices on the same level (ambitendencies) and is not able to decide what to do because one sees no real preference between the choices (ambivalences).  If developmental forces are strong enough, ultimately, the person is thrust into an existential crisis: one's social rationales no longer account for one's experiences and there are no alternative explanations.  During this phase, existential despair is the predominant emotion.  The resolution of this phase begins as individually chosen values begin to replace social mores that have been ingrained by rote and are integrated into a new hierarchy of personal values.  These new values often conflict with the person's previous social values.  Many of the status quo explanations for the "way things are," learned through education and from the social order, collapse under conscious, individual scrutiny. This causes more conflicts focused on the person's analysis of his or her own reactions to the world at large and of the behavior of self and others. Common behaviors and the ethics of the prevailing social order come to be seen as inadequate, wrong or hypocritical.  Positive maladjustment prevails. For Dąbrowski, these crises represent a strong potential for development toward personal growth and mental health.  Using a positive definition, mental health reflects more than social conformity: it involves a careful, personal examination of the world and of one's values, leading to the development of an individual personality.

Level II is a transitional period. Dąbrowski said you either fall back (reintegration on a lower level), end negatively, in suicide or psychosis or move ahead to Level III.

The transition from Level II to Level III involves a fundamental shift that requires a phenomenal amount of energy.  This period is the crossroads of development: from here one must either progress or regress. The struggle between Dąbrowski's three factors reflects this transitional crisis: "Do I follow my instincts (first factor), my teachings (second factor) or my heart (third factor)?"  The developmental answer is to transform one's lower instincts (automatic reactions like anger) into positive motivation, to resist rote and social answers, and to listen to one's inner sense of what one ought to do.

Level III: Spontaneous multilevel disintegration
Level III describes a new type of conflict: a vertical conflict between two alternatives that are not simply different, but that exist on different levels. One is genuinely higher and the other is lower in comparison. These vertical conflicts initially arise from involuntary perceptions of higher versus lower choices in life. "You just look at something, maybe for the 1000th time (to use the words of G. K. Chesterton), and it strikes you—you see this one thing differently and once you do, it changes things. You can no longer 'go back and see it the way you did before.'" Dąbrowski called this vertical dimension multilevelness. Multilevelness is a gradual realization of the "possibility of the higher" (a phrase Dąbrowski used frequently) and of the subsequent contrasts between the higher and the lower in life. These vertical comparisons often illustrate the lower, actual behavior of a person in contrast to higher, imagined ideals and alternative idealized choices. Dąbrowski believed that the authentic individual would choose the higher path as the clear and obvious one to follow (erasing the ambivalences and ambitendencies of unilevel conflicts). If the person's actual behavior subsequently falls short of the ideal, internal disharmony and a drive to review and reconstruct one's life often follow. Multilevelness thus represents a new and powerful type of conflict, a conflict that is developmental in Dąbrowski's approach.

Vertical conflicts are critical in leading to autonomy and advanced personality growth. If the person is to achieve higher levels, the shift to multilevelness must occur. If a person does not have the developmental potential to move into a multilevel view, then they will fall back from the crises of Level II to reintegrate at Level I. In the shift to multilevelness, the horizontal (unilevel) stimulus-response model of life is replaced by a vertical and hierarchical analysis. This vertical view becomes anchored by one's emerging individual value structure, and all events are seen in relation to personal ideals. These personal value ideals become the personality ideal: how the person wants to live his or her life. As events in life are seen in relation to this multilevel, vertical view, it becomes impossible to support positions that favor the lower course when higher goals can be identified (or imagined).

Level IV: Directed multilevel disintegration
In Level IV the person takes full control of their development. The involuntary spontaneous development of Level III is replaced by a deliberate, conscious and self-directed review of life from the multilevel perspective. This level marks the real emergence of the third factor, described by Dąbrowski as an autonomous factor "of conscious choice (valuation) by which one affirms or rejects certain qualities in oneself and in one's environment." The person consciously reviews his or her existing belief system and tries to replace lower, automatic views and reactions with carefully thought out, examined and chosen ideals. These new values will increasingly be reflected in the person's behavior. Behavior becomes less reactive, less automatic and more deliberate as behavioral choices fall under the influence of the person's higher, chosen ideals.

Social mores are reviewed and re-accepted by a conscious internalization when the individual feels it is appropriate. Likewise, when the person feels it is proper, a social value is reviewed and may be rejected to be replaced by a self-perceived higher alternative value. One's social orientation comes to reflect a deep responsibility based on both intellectual and emotional factors. At the highest levels, "individuals of this kind feel responsible for the realization of justice and for the protection of others against harm and injustice. Their feelings of responsibility extend almost to everything." This perspective results from seeing life in relation to one's hierarchy of values (the multilevel view) and the subsequent appreciation of the potential of how life could be, and ought to be, lived. One's disagreements with the (lower level) world are expressed compassionately in doing what one can to help achieve the "ought."

Given their genuine (authentic) prosocial outlook, people achieving higher development also raise the level of their society. Prosocial here is not just support of the existing social order. If the social order is lower and you are adjusted to it, then you also reflect the lower (negative adjustment in Dąbrowski's terms, a Level I feature). Here, prosocial is a genuine cultivation of social interactions based on higher values. These positions often conflict with the status quo of a lower society (positive maladjustment). In other words, to be maladjusted to a low-level society is a positive feature.

Level V: Secondary integration
The fifth level displays an integrated and harmonious character, but one vastly different from that at the first level. At this highest level, one's behavior is guided by conscious, carefully weighed decisions based on an individualized and chosen hierarchy of personal values. Behavior conforms to this inner standard of how life ought to be lived, and thus little inner conflict arises.

Level V is often marked by creative expression. Especially at Level V, problem solving and art represent the highest and noblest features of human life. Art captures the innermost emotional states and is based on a deep empathy and understanding of the subject. Often, human suffering and sacrifice are the subjects of these works. Truly visionary works, works that are unique and novel, are created by people expressing a vision unrestrained by convention. Advances in society, through politics, philosophy and religion, are therefore commonly associated with strong individual creativity or accomplishments.

Applications

Therapy
The theory of positive disintegration has an extremely broad scope and has implications for many areas. One central application applies to psychological and psychiatric diagnosis and treatment. Dąbrowski advocated a comprehensive, multidimensional diagnosis of the person's situation, including symptoms and developmental potentials.

Symptoms and developmental potential
If the disintegration appears to fit into a developmental context, then the person is educated in the theory and encouraged to take a developmental view of their situation and experiences. Rather than being eliminated, symptoms are reframed to yield insight and understanding into life and the person's unique situation.

The importance of narratives
Dąbrowski illustrated his theory through autobiographies of and biographies about those who have experienced positive disintegration. The gifted child, the suicidal teen or the troubled artist is often experiencing the features of TPD, and if they accept and understand the meaning of their intense feelings and crises, they can move ahead, not fall apart. The completion of an extensive autobiography to help the individual gain perspective on his or her past and present is an important component in the autopsychotherapy process. In this process, the therapist plays a very small role and acts more as an initial stimulus than an ongoing therapist.  Dąbrowski asked clients to read his books and to see how his ideas might relate to their lives.

Autopsychotherapy
For Dąbrowski, the goal of therapy is to eliminate the therapist by providing a context within which a person can understand and help oneself, an approach to therapy that he called autopsychotherapy. The client is encouraged to embark on a journey of self-discovery with an emphasis on looking for the contrast between what is higher versus what is lower within their personality and value structure. The person is encouraged to further explore their value structure, especially as it relates to the rationale and justification of positions. Discrepancies between values and behavior are highlighted. The approach is called autopsychotherapy to emphasize the important role that the individual must play in their own therapy process and in the larger process of personality development. The individual must come to see themselves as being in charge of determining or creating their own unique personality ideal and value structure. This includes a critical review of social mores and values that have been learned.

Dąbrowski was very concerned about what he called one-sided development, in which people display significant advanced development in only one aspect of life, usually intellectual. He believed that it is crucial to balance one's development.

Overexcitability
In describing overexcitability, Dąbrowski emphasized two main aspects: higher-than-average sensitivity of the nerves (receptors) and higher-than-average responsiveness of the nerves to stimuli. Dąbrowski explained, “The prefix over attached to ‘excitability’ serves to indicate that the reactions of excitation are over and above average in intensity, duration and frequency”  So, in summary, if you have strong overexcitability, you will need less stimuli to cause a reaction and your reaction will be stronger than an individual who does not demonstrate overexcitability.

Dąbrowski reminds clients that without internal dis--ease there is little stimulus for change or growth. Rather than trying to rapidly ameliorate symptoms, this approach encourages individuals to fully experience their feelings and to try to maintain a positive and developmental orientation to what they may perceive as strong depression or anxiety. An emphasis is placed on the client becoming aware that they can consciously control the direction of their life and apply what Dabrowski called autopsychotherapy.

Dąbrowski and the gifted individual
In an appendix to Dąbrowski (1967), results of investigations done in 1962 with Polish youth are reported. Specifically, "a group of gifted children and young people aged 8 to 23" were examined (p. 251). Of the 80 youth studied, 30 were "intellectually gifted" and 50 were from "drama, ballet, and plastic art schools" (p. 251). Dąbrowski found that every one of the children displayed overexcitability, "which constituted the foundation for the emergence of neurotic and psychoneurotic sets. Moreover it turned out that these children also showed sets of nervousness, neurosis, and psychoneurosis of various kinds and intensities, from light vegetative symptoms, or anxiety symptoms, to distinctly and highly intensive psychasthenic or hysterical sets" (p. 253). Dąbrowski asked why these children should display such "states of nervousness or psychoneurosis" and suggested that it was due to the presence of OE (p. 255). "Probably the cause is more than average sensitivity which not only permits one to achieve outstanding results in learning and work, but at the same time increases the number of points sensitive to all experiences that may accelerate anomalous reactions revealing themselves in psychoneurotic sets" (p. 255).

The association between OE and giftedness appears to be borne out in the research (Lysy and Piechowski 1983; Piechowski 1986; Piechowski and Miller 1995). It appears that at the least intellectual OE is a marker of potential for giftedness/creativity. Dąbrowski's thesis is that the gifted will disproportionately display this process of positive disintegration and personality growth.

Key ideas
The theory is based on key ideas that may be listed as follows:

That lower animal instincts (first factor) must be inhibited and transformed into "higher" forces for people to be Human (this ability to transform instincts is what separates people from other animals).
That the common initial personality integration, based upon socialization (second factor), does not reflect true personality.
At the initial level of integration, there is little internal conflict as when one "goes along with the group", there is little sense of individual wrongdoing. External conflicts often relate to the blockage of social goals—career frustrations for example. The social mores and values prevail with little question or conscious examination.
True personality must be based upon a system of values that are consciously and volitionally chosen by the person to reflect their own individual sense of "how life ought to be" and their "personality ideal"—the ideal person they feel they "ought to be".
The lower animal instincts and the forces of peer groups and socialization are inferior to the autonomous self (personality) constructed by the conscious person.
To break down the initial integration, crises and disintegrations are needed, usually provided by life experience.
These disintegrations are positive if the person can achieve positive and developmental solutions to the situation.
"Unilevel crises" are not developmental as the person can only choose between equal alternatives (go left or go right?).
A new type of perception involves "multilevelness", a vertical view of life that compares lower versus higher alternatives and now allows the individual to choose a higher resolution to a crisis over other available, but lower, alternatives—the developmental solution.
"Positive disintegration" is a vital developmental process.
Dąbrowski developed the idea of "developmental potential" to describe the forces needed to achieve autonomous personality development.
Developmental potential includes several factors including innate abilities and talents, "overexcitability" and the "third factor".
Overexcitability is a measure of an individual's level of nervous response. Dąbrowski found that the exemplars he studied all displayed an overly sensitive nervous system, also making them prone to angst, depression and anxiety—psychoneuroses in Dąbrowski's terms, a very positive and developmental feature.
The third factor is a measure of an individual's drive toward autonomy.
Dąbrowski's approach is very interesting philosophically as it is Platonic, reflecting the bias of Plato toward essence—an individual's essence is a critical determinant of his or her developmental course in life. However, Dąbrowski also added a major existential aspect as well, what one depends upon the anxieties felt and on how one resolves the day to day challenges one faces. Essence must be realized through an existential and experiential process of development. The characterization advanced by Kierkegaard of "Knights of faith" may be compared to Dąbrowski's autonomous individual.
Reviewed the role of logic and reasoning in development and concludes that intellect alone does not fully help people know what to do in life. Incorporates Jean Piaget's views of development into a broader scheme guided by emotion. Emotion (how one feels about something) is the more accurate guide to life's major decisions.
When multilevel and autonomous development is achieved, a secondary integration is seen reflecting the mature personality state. The individual has no inner conflict; they are in internal harmony as their actions reflect their deeply felt hierarchy of values.
Rejected Abraham Maslow's description of self-actualization (Dąbrowski was a personal friend and correspondent of Maslow's). Actualization of an undifferentiated human self is not a developmental outcome in Dąbrowski's terms. Dąbrowski applied a multilevel (vertical) approach to self and saw the need to become aware of and to inhibit and reject the lower instinctual aspects of the intrinsic human self (aspects that Maslow would have people "embrace without guilt") and to actively choose and assemble higher elements into a new unique self. Dąbrowski would have people differentiate the initial self into higher and lower aspects and to reject the lower and actualize the higher in creating unique personalities.

Secondary integration versus self-actualization
People have often equated Maslow's concept of self-actualization with Dąbrowski's level of secondary integration. There are some major differences between these two ideas. Fundamentally, Maslow described self-actualization as a process where the self is accepted "as is," so both higher and lower aspects of the self are actualized. For Maslow, self-actualization involved "being all that one can be and accepting one’s deeper self in all its aspects." Dąbrowski introduces the notion that although the lower aspects may initially be intrinsic to the self, as human beings, we can become aware of their lower nature. People can develop self-awareness as to how they feel about these low levels—if they feel badly about behaving in these lower ways, then they can cognitively and volitionally decide to inhibit and eliminate these behaviors—Dąbrowski called this personality shaping. In this way, the higher aspects of the self are actualized while the lower aspects are inhibited,and, for Dąbrowski, this is what is unique about humans and sets people apart from other animals — no other animal is able to differentiate their lower instincts and therefore can not inhibit their animalistic impulses, an idea also expressed in Plessner's eccentricity.

Controversy

For the last 40 years, efforts to measure Dabrowskian constructs have been limited to looking at overexcitability. The most widely known instrument is the Overexcitability Questionnaire—Two.

Origins
Dabrowski's worldview was undoubtedly influenced by his life experiences. As a teenager in World War I, he witnessed a major battle near his village. He walked among the bodies of the dead soldiers and later recalled that the looks on their faces were wildly different. Some expressed fear; some expressed horror, while others looked calm and peaceful. During World War II, he was imprisoned by the Nazi police several times and had his wife pay ransom to be released. Subsequently, when Stalin seized Poland, Dabrowski was imprisoned for some 18 months (along with his wife). Dabrowski said he wrote his theory to encapsulate the lowest human behaviors he had observed during the war as well as the highest acts of self-sacrifice. He said that no other psychological theory had captured this wide range of human behavior. After his release, his behavior was closely monitored by the Polish authorities until at least the early 60s. In 1965 he established a base in Edmonton, Alberta, and spent the rest of his life alternating between Canada and Poland.

See also

Notes

References

External links
 The Theory of Positive Disintegration by Kazimierz Dąbrowski
 The Polish website dedicated to Kazimierz Dąbrowski and his Theory of Positive Disintegration
 A comparison between the Zen Buddhist Ten Oxherding Pictures and the Theory of Positive Disintegration

Alternative medical treatments
Developmental psychology
Human development
Personal development
Personality theories